Kevin Rodrigues-Pires (born 12 September 1991) is a professional footballer who plays as a midfielder for Wuppertaler SV. Born in Germany, he represented Portugal at youth international level.

Early life
He played youth football with Fortuna Köln, Bayer Leverkusen, 1. FC Köln, and Alemannia Aachen.

Club career
In 2009, he made his senior debut for Alemannia Aachen II.

In 2010, he joined Schalke 04 II in the fourth tier Regionalliga West. He spent two seasons with the club.

In 2012, he moved to Rot-Weiss Essen, where he played two seasons. On March 14, 2014, he scored two goals against SSVg Velbert 02. In May 2014, he departed the club.

In 2014, he joined Sportfreunde Lotte.

In August 2015, he joined TSV Steinbach in the Regionalliga Südwest.

In January 2016 Sportfreunde Lotte. On March 22, 2017, he tore a ligament, causing him to miss several months of action. In September 2017, he re-tore the ligament after returning to training two weeks earlier, however, he would not require surgery.

He then joined Preußen Münster in the summer of 2018. He signed a contract until June 2020.

He returned to the fourth tier in the summer of 2020 with Wuppertaler SV. He made his debut in an exhibition match against fifth tier Oberliga side SSVg Velbert 02. He serves as team captain. His contract was set to expire at the end of June 2022, but he extended it for another season.

International career
In 2009, he made three appearances with the Portugal U18 team.

References

External links
 Profile at FuPa.net
 
 

1991 births
Living people
Footballers from Cologne
Citizens of Portugal through descent
Portuguese footballers
Portugal youth international footballers
German footballers
Association football midfielders
FC Schalke 04 II players
Rot-Weiss Essen players
Sportfreunde Lotte players
SC Preußen Münster players
Wuppertaler SV players
3. Liga players
German people of Portuguese descent
Regionalliga players
SC Fortuna Köln players
Bayer 04 Leverkusen players
1. FC Köln players
Alemannia Aachen players
TSV Steinbach Haiger players